"Tompkins Square Park" is a song by English rock band Mumford & Sons. It was released as the fourth single from their third studio album, Wilder Mind, on 2 November 2015, and also serves as the opening track for the album. The song peaked at number 86 on the UK Singles Chart.

Composition
"Tompkins Square Park" is an indie rock and post-punk song, recorded at AIR Studios in London. The title of the song refers to the East Village, Manhattan park of the same name. The song is centered around a deteriorating relationship. In the first line, the narrator of the song, who is one half of the relationship, requests their partner to meet them in Tompkins Square Park for a chance of rebuilding said relationship.

Video
No official music video for the song has been made, however, a video of a live version of the song has since been uploaded to the band's Vevo and YouTube channels on 3 May 2015.

Critical reception
Sputnikmusic labelled "Tompkins Square Park" as a "massive highlight," while Jon Dolan of Rolling Stone called the song Wilder Minds "sharpest moment," commenting "the sentiment is Springsteen, the guitars are straight-up Strokes, and even if it's not going to work out for the relationship in this song, the music itself bristles with self-assurance." James Rainis of Slant was more critical of the song, stating that it "stacks clichés in unexciting ways: 'But no flame burns forever/You and I both know this [all] too well.'"

Track listing

Charts

Certifications

Release history

References

2015 singles
2015 songs
Island Records singles
Glassnote Records singles
Mumford & Sons songs
Song recordings produced by James Ford (musician)
Songs written by Ben Lovett (British musician)
Songs written by Marcus Mumford
Songs written by Ted Dwane
Songs written by Winston Marshall
Song